Walter Ander "The Wizard" Williams (born April 16, 1970) is an American former professional basketball player.  A sharpshooting 6'8" forward/guard, Williams attended school at the University of Maryland from 1988 to 1992, and is credited by many for resurrecting the school's basketball program which was going through very difficult times.

College career

Born in Washington, D.C., Williams began his Maryland career only two years after the death of star Len Bias and the ensuing scandal that cost Lefty Driesell his job as coach.  When Williams arrived at Maryland, the Terrapins were also on the verge of receiving major sanctions from the NCAA due to violations committed by Driesell's successor, Bob Wade, that would lead to his resignation.  Rather than transfer to another school, Williams chose to remain at Maryland and play under new coach Gary Williams.  It was a tremendous boost for the coach, who had to start rebuilding the program from the bottom up while dealing with both the sanctions and tougher academic standards now imposed by the school.  Williams was on the Associated Press All-America Second Team as a senior at Maryland in 1991–92, averaging a school-record 26.8 points, 5.6 rebounds, 3.6 assists, and 2.1 steals.  He scored 20 or more points in 19 straight games and broke Len Bias's single-season point total record at Maryland by chalking up 776 points as a senior.

Professional career
Williams was selected by the Sacramento Kings with the seventh pick of the 1992 NBA draft and was on the 1992–93 NBA All-Rookie Second Team.  He went on to play 11 seasons in the NBA, spending time with the Kings, the Miami Heat, the Toronto Raptors, the Portland Trail Blazers, the Houston Rockets, and the Dallas Mavericks.  Williams stands third in Rockets history with a 3-point percentage of .393.  Williams averaged double digits in scoring in six of eight NBA seasons and scored 8,385 points in his career.

Williams participated in the AT&T Shootout during the 1997 NBA All-Star Weekend in Cleveland.

Williams is known for wearing his socks to his knees, he wore them high in honor of boyhood idol George Gervin. This was also a popular fashion trend among the youth in the D.C. Metro area at that time.

In June 2018, Williams and fellow former Maryland basketball star Tony Massenburg, co-wrote the book Lessons From Lenny.  The book is biographical and dives into how the death on Len Bias affected their lives and basketball decisions.  Lessons From Lenny, features contributions from Gary Williams and Charles "Lefty" Driesell, Len Elmore, Johnny Rhodes, Keith Booth, Juan Dixon, Steve Blake and more.

National team career
Williams played on the US team at the 1991 Pan American Games.

Other activities
He established a $125,000 scholarship fund at Maryland which benefits minority students in honor of his late father, Walter Sr.

Williams serves as a sideline reporter for radio broadcasts of University of Maryland men's basketball games.

Film
In 1996, he appeared in the film Eddie starring Whoopi Goldberg.

Walt Williams appeared in the Hootie & the Blowfish music video for the number one song "Only Wanna Be with You".

References

External links
Career Stats

1970 births
Living people
20th-century African-American sportspeople
21st-century African-American sportspeople
African-American basketball players
All-American college men's basketball players
American expatriate basketball people in Canada
American men's basketball players
Basketball players at the 1991 Pan American Games
Basketball players from Maryland
Basketball players from Washington, D.C.
Dallas Mavericks players
Houston Rockets players
Maryland Terrapins men's basketball players
Medalists at the 1991 Pan American Games
Miami Heat players
Pan American Games bronze medalists for the United States
Pan American Games medalists in basketball
Portland Trail Blazers players
Sacramento Kings draft picks
Sacramento Kings players
Shooting guards
Small forwards
Toronto Raptors players